Isabella High School is a K-12 public school in the unincorporated community of Isabella, located in Maplesville, Chilton County, Alabama.

References

External links
School website

Public K-12 schools in Alabama
Schools in Chilton County, Alabama